The 1972 Palestine Cup was the 1st edition of the Palestine Cup of Nations, it was held in Baghdad, Iraq between 1 January and 14 January. The tournament apparently acted as replacement for the Arab Nations Cup (or was just another name for it), which was otherwise not held between 1966 and 1985. Nine nations took part in the competition of which Egypt won.

Participated teams
The 9 participated teams are:

Squads

Venues

Group stage

Group A

Group B

Knock-out stage

Semi-finals

3rd place playoff

Final

Winners

References

External links
Details in RSSSF

1972
1972
1972 in Iraqi sport
1972 in Asian football
1971–72 in Algerian football
1972 in African football
1971–72 in Iraqi football